Nicholas dePencier Wright (born May 20, 1982) is a Canadian business lawyer and politician. He was the founding leader of the Green Party of Nova Scotia and was the founding Executive Director of the Canadian animal advocacy organization Animal Justice. He is currently founder and CEO of foreign affairs publication Geopolitical Monitor and is an elected member ("Bencher") of the governing body of the Law Society of Ontario.

Background and education
Wright was born in Toronto, Ontario. He attended Lakefield College School before moving to Halifax, Nova Scotia, where he received an honours degree in philosophy from the University of King's College, Halifax and an MBA and a law degree from Dalhousie University. He has since additionally earned an LLM in tax law from Osgoode Hall Law School.

Politics
On March 5, 2006, Wright became the leader of the Green Party of Nova Scotia at the Party's founding convention—after winning a contested nomination vote over long time Green Party of Canada candidate and organizer Sheila Richardson.

On December 19, 2006, Wright announced that he would be stepping down as leader of the Green Party of Nova Scotia upon the completion of his term, which ended in May 2007.

On May 1, 2019 Wright was elected 'Bencher' of the Law Society of Ontario as a representative for Toronto

Elections
In the 2006 federal election, Wright ran for the Green Party of Canada for the riding of Halifax and received 3.9% of the popular vote (1,948 votes), losing to NDP incumbent and former NDP federal and provincial leader Alexa McDonough.

Wright then led the Green Party of Nova Scotia through the 2006 Nova Scotia general election. He ran as a candidate for the district of Halifax Citadel and received 4.18% of the popular vote (292 votes), losing to NDP candidate Leonard Preyra.

On October 27, 2014, Wright ran for City Council in Toronto's Ward 20, losing to Joe Cressy.

On June 22, 2015, Wright was nominated Green Party of Canada candidate for Toronto's University—Rosedale for the 2015 federal election. In the election, Wright received 3% of the popular vote (1,423 votes), losing to Liberal candidate Chrystia Freeland.

On May 1, 2019, Wright successfully ran for 'Bencher' to become part of the governing body of the Law Society of Ontario as part of a slate that sought to depoliticize the organization and reduce spending and membership fees.

Post-elections
Wright practices business law in Toronto. He frequently appeared in the media for his work in support of animal protection and civil liberties.

Electoral record

References

External links
 Wright Business Law, Nick Wright's Toronto Business Law Practice
 Geopolitical Monitor, foreign affairs publication
 Animal Justice, animal advocacy organization
 Green Party of Nova Scotia site
 Nick Wright writes about seal hunt.

Living people
Lakefield College School alumni
Green Party of Canada candidates in the 2006 Canadian federal election
Nova Scotia political party leaders
Politicians from Toronto
Schulich School of Law alumni
Leaders of the Green Party of Nova Scotia
Nova Scotia candidates for Member of Parliament
Green Party of Canada candidates in the 2015 Canadian federal election
University of King's College alumni
1982 births